John Landrum Cooper (born April 7, 1975) is an American musician. He has been the lead vocalist, bassist and co-founder of Christian rock band Skillet since 1996 and the only constant member, and his side project Fight the Fury since 2018.

Career 

Cooper was briefly in experimental rock group Seraph from 1989–1995. The band released a four-song demo, titled Silence E.P., before disbanding.

Cooper formed Skillet in 1996 with Ken Steorts. Both had met while touring for previous bands; Cooper as vocalist for the Tennessee progressive rock band Seraph and Steorts as guitarist for Urgent Cry. The bands disbanded soon after, so Cooper and Steorts' pastor encouraged them to form their own band as a side-project. Coming from different styles of rock music, they decided to name the experiment Skillet. Soon afterward Trey McClurkin joined the band as a temporary drummer. Skillet was only together for a month when they received interest from major Christian record label ForeFront Records and were signed soon afterward. Ken Steorts left the band in 1999 and Trey McClurkin left the band in 2000 leaving Cooper as the only founding member of the band and primary songwriter.

Cooper provided vocals for !Hero: The Rock Opera. According to a review, Cooper did not tour with the rock opera, he only provided vocals for the Rabbi Kai on the soundtrack. Cooper was the co-writer of the Decyfer Down single "Best I Can".

He sang on the title track of tobyMac's album, Tonight, which peaked at No. 27 on the Christian Songs chart. He performed vocals on We as Human's song "Zombie", which appeared on their debut self-titled album and made a cameo appearance in the music video for "Strike Back". He signed them to his record label.

Cooper started a side project, Fight the Fury, in September 2018. He hopes the band will meet the needs of those who enjoy Skillet's heavier music. The band released an EP on Atlantic Records later in 2018 and then went on tour in Russia in December. As of October 27, 2018, They have released five songs.

Personal life

John Cooper has stated on numerous occasions that he was born and raised in a very religious family and atmosphere, and listening to rock music was not allowed in his parents' household. "You couldn't wear black, you couldn't listen to anything with drums, anything with guitars, you couldn't have long hair, you couldn't do this and you couldn't do that. Everything was so lifeless. I know I'd read the Bible and be like... 'This isn't what the Bible says. I like the idea of living for Jesus, but I hate the idea of living for you.' Ya know?"

Cooper came from a musical family. His mother was a piano teacher and a singer in the church that he went to. He began singing at a very young age, playing guitar at around the age of 18 and bass guitar at the age of 19.

As of 2016, Cooper and his wife Korey have two children.

Cooper has been an outspoken critic of the "deconstruction movement", believing that many churches are neglecting to teach the gospel as written in the Bible:

He has also garnered controversy concerning his viewpoints, as he cited backlash in 2021 commenting on the live Grammy performance of Cardi B and Megan Thee Stallion. Cooper said:

Regarding the controversy that ensued on social media, he later said he was taken out of context. He also garnered criticism regarding his views on COVID-19 vaccines and masks, and his subsequent criticism of Rage Against the Machine for promoting them.

Influences
His favorite bass guitar players are Chris Squire and Doug Pinnick.

Discography

With Seraph 

 Silence EP (1994)
 Alone
 Silence
 Wild Honey
 Fading Love

With Skillet

 Skillet (1996)
 Hey You, I Love Your Soul (1998)
 Invincible (2000)
 Alien Youth (2001)
 Collide (2003)
 Comatose (2006)
 Awake (2009)
 Rise (2013)
 Unleashed (2016)
 Victorious (2019)
 Dominion (2022)

With Fight the Fury

Extended plays

Singles

Other appearances

Bibliography 

Eden graphic novel series
 
 

Nonfiction

Notes

References

External links

Singers from Memphis, Tennessee
Skillet (band) members
1975 births
21st-century American bass guitarists
21st-century American male singers
21st-century American singers
American evangelicals
American male bass guitarists
American performers of Christian music
American rock bass guitarists
American rock singers
Critics of postmodernism
Living people
Performers of Christian rock music